Affluenza is a 2014 American drama film directed by Kevin Asch and written by Antonio Macia. It is loosely based on The Great Gatsby by F. Scott Fitzgerald.  The first leading role for Ben Rosenfield, it also stars Gregg Sulkin, Nicola Peltz and Grant Gustin.

Plot
In 2008, Fisher Miller (Ben Rosenfield), a young photography student, has a meeting with a wealthy businessman Mr. Carson (Roger Rees) to help him get into art school, only to be told his work reflects the decline of a generation rather than its future hope, Carson laments this as he declares his generation are going out of business in a "fire sale".

It then flashes back a month before the financial crash as Fisher moves in with his aunt Bunny and uncle Philip (Samantha Mathis and Steve Guttenberg) in Great Neck, New York, to escape his middle-class life for the mansions of the young, beautiful elite of Long Island's moneyed class. With a stash of high-quality marijuana and a vintage camera, he gains access to his gorgeous cousin Kate's (Nicola Peltz) circle of wealthy and indulged friends.

Fisher befriends the stepson of the community's richest resident, Dylan Carson (Gregg Sulkin), an insecure outsider in his own world who uses his money in an attempt to gain the acceptance he craves. Central to his pursuit is the love of his former flame Kate, now dating the preppy Todd (Grant Gustin). Through Fisher's help, Dylan attempts to regain Kate's affection only for the triangle to come crashing down, just as the financial system around them, with devastating consequences for all those involved.

Cast

 Ben Rosenfield as Fisher Miller 
 Gregg Sulkin as Dylan Carson 
 Nicola Peltz as Kate Miller 
 Grant Gustin as Todd Goodman 
 Steve Guttenberg as Philip Miller 
 Samantha Mathis as Bunny Miller 
 Valentina de Angelis as Jody 
 Danny Burstein as Ira Miller 
 Adriane Lenox as Professor Walker 
 Roger Rees as Mr. Carson 
 Patrick Page as Jack Goodmonda 
 Carla Quevedo as Gail
 John Rothman as Rabbi Cohen 
 Kevin Asch as Picha Photographer 
 Joe Cross as Shamanalarana
 Taylor Gildersleeve as Beth 
 Barry Rohrssen as Detective

Production
In July 2012, The Hollywood Reporter announced that Grant Gustin had landed the lead role. The main role eventually went to Ben Rosenfield, with Gustin taking a supporting role. Gregg Sulkin was later cast as the film's Jay Gatsby character Dylan and Nicola Peltz was cast as Rosenfield's cousin, completing the main cast.

Release
The film premiered at the SVA Theater in New York City on July 9, 2014, and was released in the United States on July 11, 2014 in a limited release and through video on demand.

Reception
Review aggregator website Rotten Tomatoes reported that 23% of thirteen surveyed critics gave the film a positive review; the average rating was 3.5/10.  Metacritic rated it 30 out of 100 based on twelve reviews. Andrew Barker of Variety described it as "an empty recasting of The Great Gatsby among Long Island rich kids." Frank Scheck of The Hollywood Reporter wrote that the film "attempts to tackle weighty themes but ultimately feels as shallow as the lives of most of its principal characters." Ben Kenigsberg of The New York Times called it a "millennial-chiding takeoff on The Great Gatsby" whose "vapid moralizing owes more to Bret Easton Ellis than to F. Scott Fitzgerald."

References

External links
 
 
 

2014 drama films
2014 films
2014 independent films
2010s teen drama films
American independent films
American teen drama films
Films about social class
Films based on The Great Gatsby
Films set in 2008
Films set in the Great Recession
Films set in Long Island
2010s English-language films
2010s American films